Songting railway station was a railway station in Lieshan District, Huaibei, Anhui, China. The station was an intermediate stop on the Fuliji–Jiahezhai railway.

History
This station closed in September 2018 and was subsequently demolished.

References

Railway stations in Anhui
Railway stations closed in 2018